Perizoma blandiata, the pretty pinion, is a moth of the family Geometridae. The species was first described by Michael Denis and Ignaz Schiffermüller in 1775. It is found from most of central and northern Europe to central Asia as far as the Khangai Mountains.

The wingspan is 19–23 mm. It is related to P. minorata but with the band between the basal and median obsolete or very shadowy (extremely pale brown) the median band very dark anteriorly but pale in the middle, except on the veins, the hindwing rather more strongly marked. — ab. coarctata Prout  has the median band narrowed to a mere thread. — perfasciata form. nov [Prout]. has the median band dark throughout and appears to form a constant local race in the Hebrides.
 The larva is short and powerful with short bristles and  pale green with a wide red longitudinal stripe on each side of the back.This colour combination represents an excellent camouflage and can be interpreted as an imitation of the reddish stem of the Euphrasia on which it feeds.

The species is found on moors and other open places. 

There is one generation per year with adults on wing from the end of July to August.

The larvae feed on Euphrasia species. The eggs are deposited on or near the flower buds. The larvae can be found from July to September. It overwinters as a pupa.

Subspecies
Perizoma blandiata blandiata
Perizoma blandiata perfasciata Prout, 1914 (Hebrides, Isle of Rum, Faroe Islands)

References

External links

"08462 Perizoma blandiata ([Denis & Schiffermüller], 1775) - Augentrost-Kapselspanner". Lepiforum e. V.  Retrieved 11 December 2020.

Perizoma
Moths of Europe
Moths of Asia
Moths of Iceland
Taxa named by Michael Denis
Taxa named by Ignaz Schiffermüller